Richard Purcell (by 1526 – 24 November 1586) was an English politician.

He was a Member (MP) of the Parliament of England for Shrewsbury in 1563 and 1572.

References

1586 deaths
English MPs 1563–1567
English MPs 1572–1583
Year of birth uncertain